Maximilien Paul Léon "Max" Steenberghe (2 May 1899 – 22 January 1972) was a Dutch politician of the defunct Roman Catholic State Party (RKSP), which later formed to the Catholic People's Party (KVP) and is now merged into the Christian Democratic Appeal (CDA).

Decorations

References

External links

Official
  Mr. M.P.L. (Max) Steenberghe Parlement & Politiek

1899 births
1972 deaths
Catholic People's Party politicians
Chairmen of Trade associations of the Netherlands
Dutch corporate directors
Dutch nonprofit directors
Dutch nonprofit executives
Dutch jurists
Dutch Roman Catholics
Dutch traditionalist Catholics
Dutch people of World War II
Dutch political party founders
Grand Officers of the Order of Orange-Nassau
Knights of the Order of the Netherlands Lion
Ministers of Agriculture of the Netherlands
Ministers of Economic Affairs of the Netherlands
Ministers of Finance of the Netherlands
Members of the House of Representatives (Netherlands)
People from Goirle
People from Leiden
Roman Catholic State Party politicians
Utrecht University alumni
20th-century Dutch businesspeople
20th-century Dutch politicians